The Mikhaylovka constituency (No.83) is a Russian legislative constituency in Volgograd Oblast. Until 2007 the constituency covered rural districts in northwestern Volgograd Oblast, however, after 2015 redistricting the constituency was extended southwards to urban Volgograd.

Members elected

Election results

1993

|-
! colspan=2 style="background-color:#E9E9E9;text-align:left;vertical-align:top;" |Candidate
! style="background-color:#E9E9E9;text-align:left;vertical-align:top;" |Party
! style="background-color:#E9E9E9;text-align:right;" |Votes
! style="background-color:#E9E9E9;text-align:right;" |%
|-
|style="background-color:"|
|align=left|Vladimir Plotnikov
|align=left|Independent
|
|50.65%
|-
| colspan="5" style="background-color:#E9E9E9;"|
|- style="font-weight:bold"
| colspan="3" style="text-align:left;" | Total
| 
| 100%
|-
| colspan="5" style="background-color:#E9E9E9;"|
|- style="font-weight:bold"
| colspan="4" |Source:
|
|}

1995

|-
! colspan=2 style="background-color:#E9E9E9;text-align:left;vertical-align:top;" |Candidate
! style="background-color:#E9E9E9;text-align:left;vertical-align:top;" |Party
! style="background-color:#E9E9E9;text-align:right;" |Votes
! style="background-color:#E9E9E9;text-align:right;" |%
|-
|style="background-color:"|
|align=left|Vladimir Plotnikov (incumbent)
|align=left|Agrarian Party
|
|49.66%
|-
|style="background-color:"|
|align=left|Vyacheslav Ronshin
|align=left|Power to the People
|
|17.69%
|-
|style="background-color:"|
|align=left|Vasily Safonov
|align=left|Independent
|
|14.06%
|-
|style="background-color:"|
|align=left|Vladimir Anikeyev
|align=left|Yabloko
|
|8.05%
|-
|style="background-color:#000000"|
|colspan=2 |against all
|
|8.07%
|-
| colspan="5" style="background-color:#E9E9E9;"|
|- style="font-weight:bold"
| colspan="3" style="text-align:left;" | Total
| 
| 100%
|-
| colspan="5" style="background-color:#E9E9E9;"|
|- style="font-weight:bold"
| colspan="4" |Source:
|
|}

1999

|-
! colspan=2 style="background-color:#E9E9E9;text-align:left;vertical-align:top;" |Candidate
! style="background-color:#E9E9E9;text-align:left;vertical-align:top;" |Party
! style="background-color:#E9E9E9;text-align:right;" |Votes
! style="background-color:#E9E9E9;text-align:right;" |%
|-
|style="background-color:"|
|align=left|Vladimir Plotnikov (incumbent)
|align=left|Independent
|
|42.44%
|-
|style="background-color:"|
|align=left|Anatoly Krashchenko
|align=left|Independent
|
|24.92%
|-
|style="background-color:"|
|align=left|Anatoly Bykov
|align=left|Independent
|
|9.00%
|-
|style="background-color:"|
|align=left|Ivan Gureyev
|align=left|Liberal Democratic Party
|
|4.11%
|-
|style="background-color:#FF4400"|
|align=left|Aleksandr Yeliseyev
|align=left|Andrey Nikolayev and Svyatoslav Fyodorov Bloc
|
|4.00%
|-
|style="background-color:#084284"|
|align=left|Vyacheslav Zotin
|align=left|Spiritual Heritage
|
|2.67%
|-
|style="background-color:#020266"|
|align=left|Yury Ponomarev
|align=left|Russian Socialist Party
|
|1.88%
|-
|style="background-color:"|
|align=left|Sergey Sheboldayev
|align=left|Independent
|
|0.51%
|-
|style="background-color:#000000"|
|colspan=2 |against all
|
|9.17%
|-
| colspan="5" style="background-color:#E9E9E9;"|
|- style="font-weight:bold"
| colspan="3" style="text-align:left;" | Total
| 
| 100%
|-
| colspan="5" style="background-color:#E9E9E9;"|
|- style="font-weight:bold"
| colspan="4" |Source:
|
|}

2003

|-
! colspan=2 style="background-color:#E9E9E9;text-align:left;vertical-align:top;" |Candidate
! style="background-color:#E9E9E9;text-align:left;vertical-align:top;" |Party
! style="background-color:#E9E9E9;text-align:right;" |Votes
! style="background-color:#E9E9E9;text-align:right;" |%
|-
|style="background-color:"|
|align=left|Vladimir Plotnikov (incumbent)
|align=left|Agrarian Party
|
|54.35%
|-
|style="background-color:#1042A5"|
|align=left|Nikolay Volkov
|align=left|Union of Right Forces
|
|23.33%
|-
|style="background-color:#164C8C"|
|align=left|Maria Kuznetsova
|align=left|United Russian Party Rus'
|
|4.25%
|-
|style="background-color:"|
|align=left|Aleksandr Yeliseyev
|align=left|Social Democratic Party
|
|1.65%
|-
|style="background-color:"|
|align=left|Aleksandr Losev
|align=left|Independent
|
|1.64%
|-
|style="background-color:#000000"|
|colspan=2 |against all
|
|12.60%
|-
| colspan="5" style="background-color:#E9E9E9;"|
|- style="font-weight:bold"
| colspan="3" style="text-align:left;" | Total
| 
| 100%
|-
| colspan="5" style="background-color:#E9E9E9;"|
|- style="font-weight:bold"
| colspan="4" |Source:
|
|}

2016

|-
! colspan=2 style="background-color:#E9E9E9;text-align:left;vertical-align:top;" |Candidate
! style="background-color:#E9E9E9;text-align:left;vertical-align:top;" |Party
! style="background-color:#E9E9E9;text-align:right;" |Votes
! style="background-color:#E9E9E9;text-align:right;" |%
|-
|style="background-color: " |
|align=left|Vladimir Plotnikov
|align=left|United Russia
|
|56.35%
|-
|style="background-color:"|
|align=left|Yevgeny Shamanayev
|align=left|Communist Party
|
|11.02%
|-
|style="background-color:"|
|align=left|Aleksey Mayboroda
|align=left|Liberal Democratic Party
|
|10.02%
|-
|style="background-color:"|
|align=left|Aleksey Mikheyev
|align=left|A Just Russia
|
|8.34%
|-
|style="background:"| 
|align=left|Andrey Babkin
|align=left|Patriots of Russia
|
|3.17%
|-
|style="background-color:"|
|align=left|Andrey Proshakov
|align=left|Rodina
|
|2.37%
|-
|style="background-color:"|
|align=left|Sergey Bondar
|align=left|The Greens
|
|2.09%
|-
|style="background:"| 
|align=left|Valery Kotelnikov
|align=left|Yabloko
|
|2.07%
|-
|style="background:"| 
|align=left|Anatoly Polunin
|align=left|People's Freedom Party
|
|1.26%
|-
| colspan="5" style="background-color:#E9E9E9;"|
|- style="font-weight:bold"
| colspan="3" style="text-align:left;" | Total
| 
| 100%
|-
| colspan="5" style="background-color:#E9E9E9;"|
|- style="font-weight:bold"
| colspan="4" |Source:
|
|}

2021

|-
! colspan=2 style="background-color:#E9E9E9;text-align:left;vertical-align:top;" |Candidate
! style="background-color:#E9E9E9;text-align:left;vertical-align:top;" |Party
! style="background-color:#E9E9E9;text-align:right;" |Votes
! style="background-color:#E9E9E9;text-align:right;" |%
|-
|style="background-color: " |
|align=left|Vladimir Plotnikov (incumbent)
|align=left|United Russia
|
|55.31%
|-
|style="background-color:"|
|align=left|Valery Mogilny
|align=left|Communist Party
|
|19.56%
|-
|style="background-color:"|
|align=left|Aleksey Loginov
|align=left|Liberal Democratic Party
|
|6.92%
|-
|style="background-color: "|
|align=left|Aleksey Ushakov
|align=left|New People
|
|5.27%
|-
|style="background-color:"|
|align=left|Shakhbaz Davidov
|align=left|A Just Russia — For Truth
|
|4.76%
|-
|style="background-color: "|
|align=left|Aleksey Isayev
|align=left|Party of Pensioners
|
|4.32%
|-
|style="background-color: "|
|align=left|Aleksey Zverev
|align=left|Party of Growth
|
|2.07%
|-
| colspan="5" style="background-color:#E9E9E9;"|
|- style="font-weight:bold"
| colspan="3" style="text-align:left;" | Total
| 
| 100%
|-
| colspan="5" style="background-color:#E9E9E9;"|
|- style="font-weight:bold"
| colspan="4" |Source:
|
|}

Notes

References

Russian legislative constituencies
Politics of Volgograd Oblast